The 2020–21 Northern Iowa Panthers women's basketball team represented the University of Northern Iowa during the 2020-21 NCAA Division I women's basketball season. The Panthers were led by head coach Tanya Warren in her fourteenth season, and played their home games at the McLeod Center as a member of the Missouri Valley Conference.

Previous season
The Panthers finished the 2019-20 season with an 18–11 record, including 10–8 in Missouri Valley Conference play. They were scheduled to play Illinois State in the quarterfinals of the MVC Tournament, but the game, as well as the rest of the season, were canceled due to COVID-19.

Offseason

Departures

Roster

Schedule and results

|-
!colspan=9 style=| Non-conference Regular Season

|-
!colspan=9 style=| Missouri Valley Conference Regular Season

|-
!colspan=9 style=| Missouri Valley Conference tournament

|-
!colspan=9 style=| Women's National Invitation Tournament

References

Northern Iowa
Northern Iowa
Northern Iowa Panthers women's basketball seasons
Northern Iowa
Northern Iowa